Lostwithiel signal box is a Grade II listed former Great Western Railway signal box, located on Lostwithiel railway station in Cornwall, England. The signal box is situated at the northern end of Platform 1, adjacent to the level crossing.

Bodmin branch
The single track of the Bodmin branch was controlled by an electric train staff until 28 December 1950, controlled by Bodmin Road Signal Box, after which an electric key token was used. Signalling on the branch was removed on 27 March 1968, after which points were operated by independent levers. Since Bodmin Road Signal Box was closed on 30 May 1985.  The lever frame controlling access to the Bodmin and Wenford Railway is operated under the supervision of Lostwithiel signal box.

Grade II listing
In July 2013, it was one of 26 "highly distinctive" signal boxes listed by Ed Davey, Minister for the Department for Culture, Media and Sport, after a joint initiative by English Heritage and Network Rail to preserve and provide a window into how railways were operated in the past. Historic England list the reasons for its designation as; intactness (it remains one of the best-preserved examples of what was once a standard signal box on the GWR network; date (it is considered to be the earliest known surviving GWR-designed type 5; and fittings (it retains original operating equipment including a lever frame and some train control instruments).

References

Great Western Railway
Rail transport in Cornwall
Grade II listed buildings in Cornwall
Signal boxes in the United Kingdom
Industrial archaeological sites in Cornwall
Lostwithiel